Erhard Brielmaier (January 7, 1841 – August 29, 1917) was an architect in the United States and Canada from the late 19th century through the early 20th century. He designed and built more churches and hospitals than any other architect.

History
Brielmaier was born in Neufra near Rottweil, Württemberg. His mother immigrated to America with Brielmaier and his siblings in 1850 to join their father, a carpenter who had settled in White Oak, Ohio. On November 27, 1860, Brielmaier married Theresia Haag and they had 13 children. In 1873, the clan moved to Milwaukee, where Brielmaier worked his way from carpenter, sculptor, and altar-builder to that of an architect with a national reputation.

Brielmaier's sons (Bernard Anselm, Joseph Mary, and Leo Anthony) received training in architecture, and with them he formed the organization of Erhard Brielmaier & Sons Co., Architects, which constructed over a thousand Catholic churches, schools and hospitals throughout the United States and Canada. Brielmaier had architecture offices in Chicago and Milwaukee in the late 19th century and 20th century. Brielmaier and Sons focused on the architecture of churches, hospitals (such as the Mayo Clinic Hospital), and schools and university buildings (such as Marquette University).

In 1861 Brielmaier a Gothic chapel for the Sisters of St. Francis of Assisi of St. Francis, Wisconsin. The stained glass windows were imported from Innsbruck, Austria. Three of his granddaughters subsequently joined the congregation.
  

In the Milwaukee area there are about 30 buildings by Brielmaier and his sons designated with historical status. One of the most notable is the Basilica of St. Josaphat in Milwaukee, which was based on St. Peter's Basilica in Rome. It was designed with conservation in mind by using the materials from the dismantled federal building in Chicago. The Chicago federal building's postal emblems appear as brass ornaments on the entrance doors. At the time it was constructed, St. Josaphat's has one of the largest cupola in the world. It was later designated a basilica.

Saint Anthony of Padua Catholic Church, on Ninth and Mitchell in Milwaukee, is another historical church whose interior was designed by Brielmaier. The interior of the church is still original with the high altar, four side altars, and the pulpit having been designed and crafted by Brielmaier.

Brielmaier was concerned with the education of his children who followed the Brielmaier tradition and become artists. His oldest son, John (Johannes) Erhard Brielmaier (September 4, 1861–September 9, 1913), studied wood sculpturing in Stuttgart. Johannes's artwork is found throughout the United States, mostly in altars and sculptures. His artworks are known for their depth and elaborate carvings of magnificent detail.

Brielmaier's daughter, Clotilde Elizabeth Brielmaier (March 4, 1867–March 29, 1915), spent several years in Munich and Rome studying art. Her artwork can be viewed in Europe as well as the United States. She is credited with being the first woman to own her own art studio in the United States and was credited as being an artist that could easily stand on her own alongside the male artists of her time. Many of Clotilde Brielmaier's paintings, especially the murals in chapels and churches, have been destroyed over the years, either because of natural disaster or through the simplification policy of the Catholic Church. Some of her large portraits can be found in historical museums in the United States.

The generation of Brielmaier artists following their grandfather, Erhard Brielmaier, include: Thomasita Fessler, who was born Majella Nicola Fessler on February 23, 1912 and died April 1, 2005. Sr. Thomasita established the art department at Cardinal Stritch College, becoming the chair of the art department ands founding the Studio San Damiano based on her philosophy of "Nature is God's art and art is man's nature" as well as the Brielmaier tradition of, "A child who learns to create will not destroy."

Carl (Mary) R. Brielmaier (grandson of Erhard) continued the church painting tradition. Carl was born May 12, 1892. He left his immediate family before a teen and studied with Clothilde Brielmaier. Carl was known to use many different names within his life and work, including the name Erhard so the extent of artwork credited to him is variable. Much of the church painting he is known to have created is within the Midwestern United States, mostly in Wisconsin, Michigan, and Ohio. Carl Brielmaier passed down the family's art tradition to his daughter, Rose Brielmaier.

He died in Milwaukee, Wisconsin, and is buried at Calvary Cemetery in Milwaukee, where both the historic Gothic Revival style gate house and Romanesque chapel were designed by him.

References

1841 births
1917 deaths
19th-century American architects
German emigrants to the United States
Architects from Milwaukee
American ecclesiastical architects
Architects of Roman Catholic churches
Defunct architecture firms based in Wisconsin
Defunct companies based in Milwaukee